Duzhong Park is a major city park in the eastern edge of central urban Beijing. It is located in Chaoyang District, right next to the 5th Ring Road, and is created based on a forest of eucommia ulmoides. It is one of the 15 earliest suburban public parks created by Beijing government in 2008.

Parks in Beijing